Savio railway station is located in the district of Savio in the city of Kerava, Finland. It is located between the stations of Korso and Kerava, and serves the K line between Helsinki and Kerava, as well as the T line from Helsinki to Riihimäki (at night only).

External links

References 

Railway stations in Uusimaa
Kerava